The Librarians is an American television series developed by John Rogers that is broadcast on TNT, and premiered on December 7, 2014. It is a direct spin-off of The Librarian film series, sharing continuity with the films.

In March 2018, Dean Devlin announced that TNT had cancelled the series.

Series overview

Episodes

Season 1 (2014–15)

Season 2 (2015)

Season 3 (2016–17)

Season 4 (2017–18)

References

Lists of American fantasy television series episodes
Episodes